Stiphodon martenstyni, the Martenstyn's stiphodon or Martenstyn's goby, is a species of amphidromous freshwater goby endemic to the southwestern portion of Sri Lanka. The males of this species can reach a length of  SL.

Etymology
The specific name martenstyni is named in memory of Cedric Martenstyn, who was a leading naturalist of the country killed by the Tamil militant organization Liberation Tigers of Tamil Eelam (LTTE).

References

Stiphodon
Freshwater fish of Sri Lanka
Taxa named by Ronald E. Watson
Fish described in 1998